The Slovak National Museum in Martin (from 1961 - The Ethnographic Museum in Martin) is an ethnographically oriented branch of the Slovak National Museum, it's located in Martin, Slovakia.

History 
The Slovak National Museum in Martin is the oldest and the largest workplace in the Slovak National Museum. It dates backs to the end of the 19th century, and it is connected with the establishment of the Slovak Museology Society in (1893). The foundation, development, activity and accumulation of the SNM-MT collections in Martin are connected with the work of its founding father, Andrej Kmeť, and other important personalities from the Slovak history like Ján Geryk, an ethnographer, a director, an author of open-air museum in Martin. Since its establishment the museum has acquired collections of national-geographic and historical nature (ethnography, archaeology, history, numismatics, art-history, art and sculpture, archiving and library) from the whole territory of Slovakia and also from abroad. In 1961 it was merged with the Slovak Museum in Bratislava.

Current status 
It currently operates as a nationwide specialised museum oriented on the documentation of the development of folklore culture in Slovakia, including ethnic groups, Slovaks living abroad, as well as ethno-museology from the oldest times to the present. It also creates the bases for a wide professional use and accumulation of the stores of the Martin Benka Museum, Karol Plicka Museum, the Museum of the Slovak Village, Professional Library and the Special Designation Archive, the Store of Archaeology and Cultural History.

Gallery

See also 
 Museum of the Slovak Village, Martin, Slovakia

References 

Museums in Žilina Region
Ethnographic museums in Europe
National museums
Martin, Slovakia